The El Molino Formation is a Maastrichtian geologic formation pertaining to the Puca Group of central Bolivia. The formation comprises fine-grained sandstones and sandy limestones with stromatolites deposited in a shallow marine to lacustrine environment. The formation has provided fossils of Dolichochampsa minima, and ichnofossils of Ankylosauria indet., Ornithopoda indet., Theropoda indet. and Titanosauridae indet. The tracksite of Cal Orcko is the best known example of the ichnofossil locations of the formation. The ichnofossil of Ligabueichnum bolivianum may be attributed to an ankylosaur. The fossil fish species Dasyatis molinoensis is named after the formation.

Fossil content 
Other fossils retrieved from the formation are:

 Coelodus toncoensis
 Dagetella sudamericana
 Dasyatis branisai, D. molinoensis, D. schaefferi
 Gasteroclupea branisai
 Ischyrhiza hartenbergeri
 Latinopollia suarezi
 Lepidotyle enigmatica
 Ligabueichnum bolivianum
 Noterpeton bolivianum	
 Phaerodusichthys taverni
 Pucabatis hoffstetteri
 Pucapristis branisi
 Stephanodus minimus
 Lepidosiren cf. paradoxa
 Andinichthys sp.
 Ceratodus sp.
 Enchodus sp.
 Lepisosteus sp.
 Pucalithus sp.
 Rhineastes sp.
 Santosius sp.
 Anura indet.
 Coelurosauria indet.
 Crocodylia indet.
 Dryolestidae indet.
 Eutheria indet.
 cf. Cyprinodontiformes indet.
 Gymnophiona indet.
 Heterotidinae indet.
 ?Madtsoiidae indet.
 Podocnemididae indet.
 Pycnodontidae indet.
 Sauropoda indet.
 Siluriformes indet.
 Tetragonopterinae indet.

See also 
 List of fossiliferous stratigraphic units in Bolivia
 List of stratigraphic units with dinosaur tracks
 List of stratigraphic units with theropod tracks
 Cajones Formation
 Chaunaca Formation
 La Puerta Formation
 Toro Toro Formation

References

Bibliography 
 
 
 

Geologic formations of Bolivia
Upper Cretaceous Series of South America
Cretaceous Bolivia
Maastrichtian Stage of South America
Sandstone formations
Limestone formations
Lacustrine deposits
Shallow marine deposits
Ichnofossiliferous formations
Fossiliferous stratigraphic units of South America
Paleontology in Bolivia
Formations
Formations
Formations